Ronald Lengkeek (born 14 September 1960) is a Dutch former footballer who played all of his career for Sparta Rotterdam.

He also had one appearance for the Netherlands Under-21 team.

He played mostly as a striker but could also play right-wing and attacking midfield.

Club career
Lengkeek came through the youth ranks of Sparta to become their senior team's all-time top goalscorer since the start of the Eredivisie.

He played European Cup matches with Sparta, 10 games in total (3 goals).

External links
 Player bio - Sparta fanzine In The Winning Mood 
 Career stats - Voetbal International 
He still is the clubtopscorer with 102 goals! and he played 242 games.

References

1960 births
Living people
Footballers from Rotterdam
Dutch footballers
Sparta Rotterdam players
Eredivisie players
Association football forwards